Katarína Knechtová (born March 14, 1981) is a Slovak singer-songwriter and guitarist, originally known for her work with the band Peha.

Biography 
Katarína was born in Prešov, to a Czech mother and Slovak father. In Prešov she attended the Ján Adam Raymann Gymnasium. After finishing school, she studied philosophy. For seven years she studied to play keyboard, she is also a self-taught guitarist. She started her music career in local band named Prešovčatá. Katarína has a younger sister, Veronika.

Music career 
Katarína Knechtová debuted on the Slovak music scene in 1996 in the band IMT Smile led by Ivan Tásler. One year later she left the band with drummer and moved to Peha band, which was later in 1999 called the revelation of a year in Slovakia. Two years later, Katarína won the Aurel award as the best female singer (in 2005 she won again). She is also a winner of OTO award in 2007.

Even though she is a writer of a lot of lyrics, she admits that her "main writer" is Vlado Krausz.

In 2008, she left her band Peha to pursuit a solo career.

Discography

Albums

Studio albums

Compilations

Singles

Other appearances
2011: Tante Cose da Veder with Petr Hapka, Michal Horáček & Ondřej Brzobohatý

See also
 The 100 Greatest Slovak Albums of All Time

References
General

Specific

External links 

 Official page of Katarína Knechtova
 Katarína Knechtová on Myspace

21st-century Slovak women singers
1981 births
Living people
People from Prešov